Uncle Drew is a 2018 American sports comedy film directed by Charles Stone III and written by Jay Longino. It stars Kyrie Irving as the title character from his Pepsi Max advertisements that began airing in 2012, along with former NBA players Shaquille O'Neal, Chris Webber, Reggie Miller, and Nate Robinson, as well as former WNBA player Lisa Leslie. Lil Rel Howery, Erica Ash, J. B. Smoove, Mike Epps, Tiffany Haddish, and Nick Kroll also star.

The film was released in the United States by Lionsgate on June 29, 2018, and received mixed reviews from critics, who praised the performances of the cast, but called the direction and screenplay "formulaic".

Plot

In Harlem, Dax Winslow is the underappreciated coach of the Harlem Money and their star player, Casper Jones. Dax spends lavishly to keep both his girlfriend, Jess, and Casper happy, despite being a clerk at Foot Locker. During practice Mookie Bass, Dax's longtime rival, arrives and taunts him about the upcoming Rucker Classic tournament. In a dream sequence, it is revealed that Dax was an orphan who planned on becoming a basketball player, but was humiliated by Mookie after he had a shot blocked by him in their youth. The next day at work Casper demands expensive new shoes from Dax, who effectively bankrupts himself purchasing them. Despite this, Mookie successfully recruits Casper and the rest of Dax's team away from him, leading to a confrontation involving Dax forcibly trying to remove Casper's shoes that is filmed and shown on ESPN. Due to this humiliation, Jess dumps him and kicks him out of her apartment.

Dejected, Dax has little luck finding players for a new team until the cantankerous Angelo encourages him to seek out Uncle Drew, a well-remembered basketball legend who, along with his team, disappeared after missing the final game of the 1968 Rucker Classic. After seeing a demonstration of Drew's prowess, Dax recruits him for the team, neglecting to inform him about the tournament's prize money. Drew agrees to join Dax under the condition that they recruit his original teammates.

They set off in Drew's van and recruit Preacher, who has since become an actual preacher, but incur the wrath of his wife Betty Lou who pursues them as they leave town. They next reunite with the partially blind Lights and wheelchair user Boots whose granddaughter, Maya, volunteers at the nursing home looking after them. They escape and make it to the karate dojo of Big Fella. Big Fella is reluctant to join the team, as he still holds a grudge against Drew, but Dax persuades him to join. After his credit card is declined at a gas station, Dax attempts to hustle the coach of a youth girls basketball team to earn money for fuel. Dax's team loses, but Drew offers up the money to help Dax after learning the real motive for the game, and Maya begins to appreciate him for the way he treats the elders.

Returning to Rucker Park, Drew gives each member of his team gear that restores their faith and abilities, but Big Fella still refuses to cooperate with Drew. During the team's first game in the tournament Big Fella and Drew tussle on the court, almost costing them the win. Eventually, Drew acknowledges his mistake: sleeping with Big Fella's now deceased wife before the big game. He admits that he too loved her and the two make amends.

Meanwhile, Dax learns that Mookie and Jess are dating, and begins falling for Maya. After learning about the tournament's prize money from Angelo and realizing he was misled, Drew angrily confronts Dax. Dax confides in him about his past with Mookie, causing Drew to forgive him. While playing in the semi-finals, Big Fella suddenly has a heart attack and is taken to the hospital. Betty Lou arrives but instead of chastising Preacher, she agrees to fill in as the team's fifth member.

Dax and his team, now renamed the Harlem Buckets, play against Mookie's team in the finals who are an even match for them. Late in the game Lights and Casper collide and are both injured, forcing Dax and Mookie to fill in. Dax still lacks self-confidence, but his teammates give him the advice he needs and he manages to make the game-winning shot, beating Mookie and earning everyone's respect. Returning to the hospital the team reunite with Big Fella, Dax uses the prize money to pay his medical bills, and ESPN now hails Dax as a hero.

During the credits Jess is shown trying to call Dax about getting back together, becoming increasingly distraught when he does not answer.

Cast
 Kyrie Irving as Uncle Drew, a streetball legend.
Shaquille O'Neal as Big Fella, Uncle Drew's former teammate who now runs a martial arts dojo.
 Chris Webber as Preacher, Uncle Drew's former teammate who is now a church minister.
 Reggie Miller as Wilbur "Lights" Wallace, Uncle Drew's former teammate who is legally blind.
 Nate Robinson as Boots, Uncle Drew's former teammate who has catatonic schizophrenia.
 Lisa Leslie as Betty Lou, Preacher's wife.
Aaron Gordon as Casper Jones, a streetball player 
 Lil Rel Howery as Dax Winslow, a streetball team manager.
 Ashton Tyler as Young Dax
 Erica Ash as Maya, Boots' granddaughter and Dax's love interest.
 J.B. Smoove as Angelo, a Harlem resident who remembers Uncle Drew.
 Mike Epps as Louis, a Harlem resident who is Angelo's friend.
 Tiffany Haddish as Jess, Dax's materialistic ex-girlfriend and Mookie's girlfriend.
 Nick Kroll as Mookie Bass, Dax's longtime rival.
 Wesley Witherspoon as Mario, a streetball player.
 Barry Rohrssen as a referee.

Making cameo appearances as themselves are Sal Masekela, John Calipari, Jon Hammond, Scoop Jackson, Pee Wee Kirkland, Earl Monroe, Chris Mullin, Bill Walton, George Gervin, Steve Nash, David Robinson, Jerry West, Dikembe Mutombo, NeNe Leakes, Rick Barry, Rick Ross, Scott Van Pelt and Ben Nethongkome.

Production
On February 16, 2017, PepsiCo announced that it would partner Temple Hill Entertainment for the production of the film, featuring the character Uncle Drew from the Pepsi Max advertisements. On September 5, 2017, ESPN's SportsCenter revealed the cast. Lil Rel Howery said that Irving heard about his trade from the Cleveland Cavaliers to the Boston Celtics while filming.

Music and soundtrack
The film's soundtrack, Uncle Drew: Original Motion Picture Soundtrack, was released by RCA Records on June 18, 2018. Many artists were featured on the album, including Wiz Khalifa, 2 Chainz, French Montana, Khalid, 21 Savage, Leikeli47, H.E.R., Kid Ink, G-Eazy and LunchMoney Lewis.

Track listing:

 "Harlem Anthem" - A$AP Ferg
 "1942" - G-Eazy featuring Yo Gotti and YBN Nahmir
 "New Thang" - French Montana and Remy Ma
 "Cocky" - A$AP Rocky, Gucci Mane and 21 Savage featuring London On Da Track
 "I Can Feel It" - GoldLink featuring H.E.R.
 "Light Flex" - Tone Stith featuring 2 Chainz
 "Chain Gang" - Leikeli47 featuring Clyde Guevara
 "Ballin" - Logic
 "Records" - Cousin Stizz
 "Stronger" - Dipset featuring Drama
 "I Need Your Lovin" - Nao
 "Stay" - Khalid
 "Us" - Kid Ink featuring Elley Duhé
 "What's the Play" - Wiz Khalifa
 "Clap Your Hands" - Saygrace
 "Ridiculous" - Kyrie Irving featuring LunchMoney Lewis

Reception

Box office
Uncle Drew has grossed $42.5 million in the United States and Canada, and $4.1 million in other territories, for a total worldwide gross of $46.5 million.

In the United States and Canada, Uncle Drew was released alongside Sicario: Day of the Soldado, and was projected to gross $11–15 million from 2,742 theaters in its opening weekend. It made $6.1 million on its first day, including $1.1 million from Thursday night previews. It went on to debut to $15.5 million, finishing fourth at the box office, behind Jurassic World: Fallen Kingdom, Incredibles 2, and Sicario: Day of the Soldado. It fell 56% in its second weekend, to $6.7 million, finishing sixth.

Critical response
The website's critical consensus reads, "Kyrie Irving's crossover to comedy is amiable enough to score with basketball fans, but Uncle Drew is held back by formulaic direction and too much product placement." On Metacritic, which assigns a normalized rating to reviews, the film has a weighted average score of 57 out of 100, based on reviews from 27 critics, indicating "mixed or average reviews". Audiences polled by CinemaScore gave the film an average grade of "A" on an A+ to F scale.

David Ehrlich of IndieWire gave the film a "B−" and wrote: "At heart, Uncle Drew is a personality-driven film. The plot is spare, and the storytelling gets super janky whenever screenwriter Jay Longino is asked to manufacture a new obstacle. But as wince-inducing as it can be to watch the film stall for time, or use the Rucker prize money to muster up some hollow conflict, the climactic streetball showdown pays off." Varietys Peter Debtuge praised the performances of the NBA players and makeup, while saying the film is never that surprising or funny, writing, "While it won't increase your appetite for zero-calorie sugar water one bit (oddly enough, Nike gets far more prominent on-screen placement), this affectionate basketball-themed comedy from sports-savvy director Charles Stone III comes across as an effective feature-length ad for the game itself."

Accolades

Uncle Drew PepsiMax advertisements
In 2012, PepsiCo embarked on an internet-based advertising campaign for Pepsi Max with the character "Uncle Drew" played by Kyrie Irving. The first advertisement was conceived as being in the form of a short film rather than an explicit commercial. During the advertising campaign, some of the shorts were edited down to 30 second segments which appeared both online and on television. The original short was wildly popular; it was reported to be the second most watched "advertisement" on YouTube that year and among the 50 most-viewed viral videos worldwide, garnering more than 22 million views. PepsiCo and its advertising agency Davie Brown Entertainment quickly rolled out another commercial, Uncle Drew: Chapter 2, this time co-starring future NBA teammate Kevin Love and opening with an extended cameo by basketball legend Bill Russell. Over the next few years two more chapters followed, including NBA and WNBA stars Maya Moore, Nate Robinson, Ray Allen, Baron Davis, and J.B. Smoove. Some of these players appeared in the 2018 feature length movie.  Each chapter ranged between 5 to 7 minutes in length.  Collectively they received over 118 million views by mid 2020 on YouTube.

The intention of these shorts was to form the backbone of an advertising campaign but Pepsi decided not to be heavy handed with the product.  Marc Gilbar, then a creative director at Davie Brown, described how product placement was sufficient for their goals "[We] put a couple of barrel coolers of Pepsi MAX on the outside of the court. It was a warm night, and they were free, so people naturally started drinking it. In some places it may have felt like it was placed there, and it was, but the people weren't acting." PepsiCo also owns the Gatorade brand which can be seen in the shorts and feature films.

Kyrie Irving is credited as writer and director in these productions but that is inaccurate. He did develop the character's personality, improvised dialog, and blocked out a lot scenes. But in fact, Gilbar and the Davie Brown team created the Uncle Drew universe, makeup artist Ed French came up with the character's look, and Jonathan Klein directed. Klein was reported to give up credit to Irving to make the shorts seem more intriguing. Gilbar went on to be involved with the production of the 2018 feature length movie.

References

External links
 
 PepsiMax Uncle Drew short film
 PepsiMax Uncle Drew: Chapter 2 short film
 PepsiMax Uncle Drew: Chapter 3 short film
 PepsiMax Uncle Drew: Chapter 4 short film

2018 films
2010s sports comedy films
2010s comedy road movies
African-American comedy films
African-American films
American basketball films
American comedy road movies
American sports comedy films
2010s English-language films
Films directed by Charles Stone III
Films scored by Christopher Lennertz
Films set in Harlem
Films set in Washington, D.C.
Summit Entertainment films
Lionsgate films
PepsiCo
2018 comedy films
Films produced by Wyck Godfrey
Works based on advertisements
2010s American films